Ibandronic acid is a bisphosphonate medication used in the prevention and treatment of osteoporosis and metastasis-associated skeletal fractures in people with cancer. It may also be used to treat hypercalcemia (elevated blood calcium levels).  It is typically formulated as its sodium salt ibandronate sodium.

It was patented in 1986 by Boehringer Mannheim and approved for medical use in 1996.

Medical uses

Ibandronate is indicated for the treatment and prevention of osteoporosis in post-menopausal women. In May 2003, the U.S. Food and Drug Administration (FDA) approved Ibandronate as a daily treatment for post-menopausal osteoporosis. The basis for this approval was a three-year, randomized, double-blind, placebo-controlled trial women with post-menopausal osteoporosis. Every participant also received daily oral doses of calcium and 400IUs [international units] of vitamin D. At the study's conclusion, both doses significantly reduced the occurrence risk of new vertebral fractures by 50–52 percent when compared to the effects of the placebo drug.

Ibandronate is efficacious for the prevention of metastasis-related bone fractures in multiple myeloma, breast cancer, and certain other cancers.

Adverse effects
In 2008, the U.S Food and Drug Administration (FDA) issued a communication warning of the possibility of severe and sometimes incapacitating bone, joint or muscle pain. A study conducted by the American Society of Bone and Mineral Research concluded that long-term use of bisphosphonates, including Boniva, may increase the risk of a rare but serious fracture of the femur.
 The drug also has been associated with osteonecrosis of the jaw, relatively rare but serious condition.

Pharmacology

Brand names
Ibandronic acid is marketed under the trade names Boniva in the US, Bondronat in Europe, Bonviva in Asia, Bandrone in India, Ibandrix in Ecuador, Adronil in Pakistan, Bondrova in Bangladesh and Bonprove in Egypt, Fosfonat in Mexico.

References

External links 
 

Amines
Bisphosphonates
Farnesyl pyrophosphate synthase inhibitors
Hoffmann-La Roche brands
Genentech brands
GSK plc brands